Basque dialects are linguistic varieties of the Basque language which differ in pronunciation, vocabulary and grammar from each other and from Standard Basque. Between six and nine Basque dialects have been historically distinguished:

Biscayan
Gipuzkoan
Upper Navarrese (Northern and Southern)
Lower Navarrese (Eastern and Western)
Lapurdian
Souletin (Souletin and Roncalese)

In modern times, however, both Lower Navarrese and Lapurdian are considered part of a Navarrese–Lapurdian dialect, so there would be five dialects, divided into 11 subdialects and 24 minor varieties.

The boundaries of all these dialects do not coincide directly with current political or administrative boundaries. It was believed that the dialect boundaries between Bizkaian, Gipuzkoan and Upper Navarrese showed some relation to some pre-Roman tribal boundaries between the Caristii, Varduli and Vascones. However, main Basque dialectologists now deny any direct relation between those tribes and Basque dialects. It seems that these dialects were created in the Middle Ages from a previously quite unified Basque language, and the dialects diverged from each other since then as a result of the administrative and political division that happened in the Basque Country.

History of Basque dialectology

One of the first scientific studies of Basque dialects, regarding the auxiliary verb forms, was made by Louis-Lucien Bonaparte, a nephew of Napoleon Bonaparte. His original dialect map, Carte des Sept Provinces Basques, was published in 1863 along with his Le Verbe Basque en Tableaux was regarded as the authoritative guide in Basque dialectology for a century. He collected his data in fieldwork between 1856 and 1869 in five visits to the Basque Country. By then, the Basque language was in retreat throughout the territory in which it had been commonly spoken. In Álava, Basque had all but vanished from the Plains and the Highlands, remaining only in the stronghold of Aramaio and bordering fringes of Biscay and Gipuzkoa, while in Navarre the scholar collected the last live evidence in areas extending as far south as Tafalla.
        
In 1998, Koldo Zuazo, Professor of Basque Philology at the University of the Basque Country, redefined the dialect classifications slightly. For example, he changed the name of Biscayan to Western, Gipuzkoan to Central, Upper Navarrese to Navarrese. He also grouped Lapurdian with Lower Navarrese, distinguished Eastern Navarrese as an independent dialect, and recognised several mixed areas:
Western (Biscayan)
Central (Gipuzkoan)
(Upper) Navarrese
Eastern Navarrese (including Salazarese and the extinct Roncalese)
Navarrese–Lapurdian
Souletin

Some research has also been carried out on the Basque dialect spoken formerly in Álava which appears to mix Western and Navarrese features.

Key distinguishing features in Basque dialect phonology include:
divergence of historic  into 
Souletin development of the vowel

Morphological variation
Modern Basque dialects show a high degree of dialectal divergence. However, cross-dialectal communication even without prior knowledge of either Standard Basque or the other dialect is normally possible to a reasonable extent, with the notable of exception of Zuberoan (also called Souletin), which is regarded as the most divergent Basque dialect.

The names for the language in the dialects of Basque (Euskara in Standard Basque) for example exemplify to some degree the dialectal fragmentation of the Basque speaking area. The most divergent forms are generally found in the Eastern dialects.

The following map shows the approximate areas where each word is used. The smaller-type instances are cases of the name being recorded for a particular area, the larger-type instances show super-regional forms common throughout the dialect area in question:

Comparison of sample verb forms
Comparing the forms of the Basque verb used in the different Basque dialects also gives a good overview over some of the differences and common features.

Phonological variation

Basque dialects all diverge from this standard inventory to a larger or lesser extent. The grapheme j (historically /j/) displays by far the most noticeable divergence, followed by the fricatives and affricates. Hualde (1991) describes the following:
 Baztan, an Eastern Navarrese dialect: lack of /x/
 Arbizu, a dialect in a mixed Gipuzkoan/Western Navarrese dialect area: geminate vowels /i/~/ii/, /e/~/ee/, /a/~/aa/, /o/~/oo/, /u/~/uu/
 Gernika, a Biscayan dialect: merger of /s̻/ with /s̺/ and /ts̻/ with /ts̺/. Additional phonemes: /ʒ/. Lack of /c/ and /ɟ/.
 Ondarroa, a Biscayan dialect: merger of /s̻/ with /s̺/ and /ts̻/ with /ts̺/. Additional phonemes: /dz/. Lack of /c/ and /ɟ/.

Standardized dialects
There have been various attempts throughout history to promote standardised forms of Basque dialects to the level of a common standard Basque.

A standardised form of Lower Navarrese was the dialect used by influential 16th-century author Joanes Leizarraga.
Azkue's Gipuzkera Osotua ("Complemented Gipuzkoan"), dating to 1935, attempted, though largely unsuccessfully, to create a standardized Basque based on Gipuzkoan, complemented with elements from other dialects.
In the 1940s, a group called Jakintza Baitha ("Wisdom House") gathered around the academician Federico Krutwig, who preferred to base the standard on the Lapurdian of Joanes Leizarraga's Protestant Bible and the first printed books in Basque. However, they did not receive support from other Basque language scholars and activists.
In 1944, Pierre Lafitte published his Navarro-Labourdin Littéraire, based on Classical Lapurdian, which has become the de facto standard form of Lapurdian. It is taught in some schools of Lapurdi and used on radio, in church, and by the newspaper Herria.
Since 1968, Euskaltzaindia has promulgated a Unified (or Standard) Basque (Euskara batua) based on the central dialects that has successfully spread as the formal dialect of the language. Batua is found in official texts, schools, TV, newspapers and in common parlance by new speakers, especially in the cities, whereas in the countryside, with more elderly speakers, people remain more attached to the natural dialects, especially in informal situations.
More recently, the distinct dialects of Bizkaian and Zuberoan have also been standardised.

References

Bibliography
 
 
 

 
Dialects by language